The Pepsi Championship, also known as the Pepsi-Boys Club Open, was a golf tournament on the PGA Tour that was played at Pine Hollow Country Club in East Norwich, New York for a single year — 1958. The purse was the largest on the PGA Tour that year and was the first PGA Tour event ever held on Long Island.

The "Pine Hollow" course at the Pine Hollow Country Club is an 18-hole, par-71 championship course that was designed by William F. Mitchell and opened in 1958.

Winners

References

Former PGA Tour events
Golf in New York (state)
Sports in Long Island